E. innotata may refer to:
 Epocilla innotata, Thorell, 1895, a spider species in the genus Epocilla found in Myanmar
 Eupithecia innotata innotata, the angle-barred pug,  a moth species found in Europe
 Eutropis innotata, a skink species found in peninsular India

See also
 Innotata